Vexillum gourgueti is a species of sea snail, a marine gastropod mollusk, in the family Costellariidae, the ribbed miters.

References

gourgueti
Gastropods described in 2012